Swimming at the 1980 Summer Paralympics consisted of 192 events.

In certain events, there were only three competitors, thus guaranteeing each a medal upon successfully completing the race. In others, there were fewer than three; in the women's 4x100 metre freestyle relay C-D, for instance, the Canadian team swam unopposed, obtaining gold upon completing the event. The women's 3x50 metre medley relay CP C was the only event in which no medal was awarded. The United States team were the only competitors, but were disqualified during the race; thus, no team completed the event.

Medal table

Participating nations

Medal summary

Men's events

Women's events

References 

 
1980 Summer Paralympics events
1980
Paralympics